Pindos ( - Dimos Pindeon, before 2001: Δήμος Πυνδαίων - Dimos Pyndaion) is a former municipality in the Trikala regional unit, Thessaly, Greece. Since the 2011 local government reform it is part of the municipality Pyli, of which it is a municipal unit. The municipal unit has an area of 166.219 km2. Population 917 (2011). It takes its name from the Pindus mountains.

References

Populated places in Trikala (regional unit)

el:Δήμος Πύλης#Πινδαίων